Mount Whillans is a mountain in Antarctica, 870 meters in height, standing 4 nautical miles (7 km) southwest of Mount Stroschein in Anderson Hills in northern Patuxent Range, Pensacola Mountains.

It was mapped by the United States Geological Survey (USGS) from surveys and U.S. Navy air photos from 1956 to 1966. It was named by the Advisory Committee on Antarctic Names (US-ACAN) for Ian M. Whillans, a glaciologist at Palmer Station during the winter of 1967.

Mountains of Queen Elizabeth Land
Pensacola Mountains